Jay Simeon (born July 27, 1976) is a Canadian artist of Haida heritage on his father's side. He was born into the Kaawaas branch of the Sdast’a.aas Eagle clan. His crests are Eagle, Supernatural Killer Whale, Frog, Beaver, and Raven. His mother is of Blackfoot ancestry and he was born in Fort Macleod, Alberta.

Jay has been practicing Haida art since the age of 14, finding his passion while studying the fundamentals of Haida design with his aunt, Sharon Hitchcock.

Jay completed an advanced design course at Vancouver Community College and studied advanced design with Robert Davidson at the Vancouver Aboriginal Friendship Center. He has been included in every major gallery exhibit featuring Haida artworks held since 2003 at leading galleries in Vancouver, BC and Seattle, WA. His art spans a variety of media including wood, argillite, silver, gold and silkscreen prints.

Especially of note, Jay's work has been featured in the exhibition Raven Travelling at the Vancouver Art Gallery in 2006, the largest Haida exhibition in recent years. His work is also in the permanent collection of the Burke Museum of Natural History and Culture, Seattle, WA. His most recent creation of note being a grand piano painted with one of his designs, especially for the Olympics; the paint used was infused with the dust of argillite from Haida Gwaii.

References

External links
  Jay Simeon Official Site
  Vancouver Aboriginal Friendship Centre
 Vancouver Community College

1976 births
Living people
20th-century First Nations sculptors
Canadian male sculptors
20th-century Canadian male artists
21st-century Canadian sculptors
21st-century Canadian male artists
21st-century First Nations people
First Nations jewelers
First Nations printmakers
First Nations stone carvers
Haida woodcarvers